The sticking probability is the probability that molecules are trapped on surfaces and adsorb chemically. From Langmuir's adsorption isotherm, molecules cannot adsorb on surfaces when the adsorption sites are already occupied by other molecules, so the sticking probability can be expressed as follows:

Similarly, when molecules adsorb on surfaces dissociatively, the sticking probability is

The square is owing to the fact that a disassociation of 1 molecule into 2 parts requires 2 adsorption sites. These equations are simple and can be easily understood but cannot explain experimental results.

In 1958, P. Kisliuk  presented an equation for the sticking probability that can explain experimental results. In his theory, molecules are trapped in precursor states of physisorption before chemisorption. Then the molecules meet adsorption sites that molecules can adsorb to chemically, so the molecules behave as follows.

If these sites are not occupied, molecules do the following (with probability in parentheses):

 adsorb on the surface chemically
 desorb from the surface
 move to the next precursor state
  
and if these sites are occupied, they

 desorb from the surface
 move to the next precursor state

Note that an occupied site is defined as one where there is a chemically bonded adsorbate so by definition it would be . Then the sticking probability is, according to equation (6) of the reference,

When , this equation is identical in result to Langmuir's adsorption isotherm.

Notes

References
 The constitution and fundamental properties of solids and liquids. part i. solids. Irving Langmuir; J. Am. Chem. Soc. 38, 2221-95 1916 

Physical chemistry
Materials science